Fogny is a village in the Casamance region of Senegal. The village is located on the Casamance River.

Notable people
Assane Seck  (born 1919), politician

Bibliography
Christian Roche, Histoire de la Casamance : Conquête et résistance 1850-1920, Karthala, 2000, 408 p. (Thèse Université de Paris I, remaniée) 
Famara Sané, Le commandement indigène dans l’administration coloniale du Fooñi, 1895-1960, Université de Dakar, 1996, 87 p. (Mémoire de Maîtrise)
Sambou Simon, Le Fogny et les Français, 1894-1920, Université de Dakar, 1995, 129 p. (Mémoire de maîtrise)

Populated places in Senegal